Iksan Public Stadium is a multi-use stadium in Iksan, South Korea built in 1991. It was used as the stadium of Hallelujah FC matches until the Gimpo City Stadium opened in 2004.  The capacity of the stadium is 25,000 spectators, all seated.

External links
 Stadium history

Multi-purpose stadiums in South Korea
Football venues in South Korea
Iksan
Sports venues in North Jeolla Province
Sports venues completed in 1991
1991 establishments in South Korea
20th-century architecture in South Korea